Senator Monk may refer to:

Elisha Capen Monk (1828–1898), Massachusetts State Senate
Robert W. Monk (1866–1924), Wisconsin State Senate